Yeniyazı is a village in the Genç District, Bingöl Province, Turkey. The village is populated by Kurds of the Botikan tribe and had a population of 318 in 2021.

The hamlets of Ağılcık, Bulgurlu, Çevreli, Demirdöven, Fırat, Hülücek, Işıkoluk, Kaldırım, Sağlık, Tepecik, Tımarlı, Yıldırım, Yumrulu and Yüceler are attached to the village.

References 

Villages in Genç District
Kurdish settlements in Bingöl Province